Palmeiras Futebol Clube de Quelimane is a Mozambican football club based in Quelimane, Zambezia Province. In 2011, the team reached the semifinal of the Taça de Moçambique, and the following season came within one point of promotion to the Moçambola, the top division of football in Mozambique.

References

Quelimane
Football clubs in Mozambique